The Spirit of 1914 (German: Augusterlebnis) was the alleged jubilation in Germany at the outbreak of World War I. Many individuals remembered that euphoria erupted on 4 August 1914, after all the political parties in the Reichstag, including the previously-antimilitarist Social Democratic Party of Germany (SPD), supported the war credits in a unanimous vote, later referred to as the Burgfrieden (literally "castle peace" but more accurately "party truce"). Many, particularly those in the middle class, believed Germany had ended its decades of bitter domestic political conflict.  The string of military victories in the following weeks, which demonstrated what Germany could accomplish when unified and suggested that the war would be short, reinforced the ebullience.  Many on the political right accordingly believed until the Nazi era that those first weeks of the war were Germany's finest hour, the German equivalent of the French Revolution. Until the 1990s, most historians took the memory of the Spirit of 1914 at face value and claimed that the enthusiasm in August 1914 was universal.

The reality was more complex.  There was widespread apprehension when Germany declared war on 1 August 1914, and civilians watched their loved ones march off to battle in the following weeks. Middle-class nationalists were the most enthusiastic and published countless tracts and editorials hailing the new political unity. An estimated one million war poems were sent to German newspapers in August 1914 alone. Dissent was smothered by this overabundance of literature cheering the war, the promise not to violate the Burgfrieden and the fear of undermining support for loved ones on the front. It accordingly appeared that the Spirit of 1914 was universal. The memory of Spirit of August 1914 persisted even when the actual support for the war waned with the horrifying casualties on the front and the terrible hunger on the home front caused by the British blockade of Germany.

During the Weimar Republic, the popular perception that Germany had been stabbed in the back rendered the public vulnerable to the Nazis, who embraced the language of the Spirit of 1914 with their aim of seizing power throughout Germany.

Gallery

See also 

 Burgfriedenspolitik
 Sacred Union
 Spirit of 1917

References
 Jeffrey Verhey, The Spirit of 1914:  Militarism, Myth and Mobilization in Germany (New York:  Cambridge Univ., 2000).
 Christian Geinitz, Kriegsfurcht und Kampfbereitschaft:  Das Augusterlebenis in Freiburg:  Ein Studie zum Kriegsbeginn 1914 (Essen:  Klartext, 1998).
 Peter Fritzsche, Germans into Nazis (Cambridge, MA:  Harvard Univ. Press, 1998).
Maximilian Konrad, The European War Enthusiasm of 1914 in: Lakitsch/Reitmair/Seidel (eds.), Bellicose Entanglements 1914 – The Great War as a Global War, Wien 2015, 15-42.
 Thomas Raithel, Das 'Wunder' der inneren Einheit:  Studien zur deutschen und französischen Öffentlichkeit bei Beginn des Ersten Weltkrieges (Bonn:  Bouvier, 1996).
 Wolfgang Kruse, Krieg und nationale Integration:  Eine Neuinterpretation des sozialdemokratischen Burgfriedensschlusses 1914/15 (Essen:  Klartext, 1994).
 Reinhard Rürup, "Der 'Geist von 1914' in Deutschland:  Kriegsbegeisterung und Ideologisierung des Kriegs im Ersten Weltkrieg," in Ansichten vom Krieg, ed. Bernd Hüppauf  (Königstein /Ts.: Forum Academicum, 1984).
 

German Empire in World War I
1914 in Germany